Lyciasalamandra helverseni, the Karpathos salamander, is a species of salamander in the family Salamandridae found only in Greece. Its natural habitats are Mediterranean-type shrubby vegetation and rocky areas.

References

helverseni
Endemic fauna of Greece
Taxonomy articles created by Polbot
Amphibians described in 1963